Hesperia florinda  is a butterfly in the family Hesperiidae (Hesperiinae). It is found in the East Palearctic in Transbaikalia to Korea, Amur, Ussuri and  Japan. The larva feeds on  Carex. There is a  single broods. The egg hibernates. Hesperia florinda  was previously a subspecies of Hesperia comma.

Subspecies
Hesperia florinda florinda
Hesperia florinda rozhkovi Kurentzov, 1970 (Transbaikalia)

References

Hesperia (butterfly)
Butterflies of Asia
Butterflies of Japan
Insects of Mongolia
Butterflies described in 1878
Taxa named by Arthur Gardiner Butler